In My Own Sweet Way is a live album led by trumpeter Woody Shaw which was recorded in Switzerland in 1987 and released on the German In + Out label.

Reception

Scott Yanow of Allmusic stated, "Although trumpeter Woody Shaw never really broke through to gain the recognition he deserved, he also never recorded an unworthy album... Excellent advanced hard bop".

Track listing 
All compositions by Woody Shaw except as indicated
 "The Organ Grinder" - 8:33
 "In Your Own Sweet Way" (Dave Brubeck) - 8:33
 "The Dragon" (Fred Henke) - 8:41
 "Just a Ballad for Woody" - 10:03
 "Sippin' at Bells" (Miles Davis) - 7:21
 "Estaté" (Bruno Martino) - 5:19
 "Joshua C." - 13:32

Personnel 
Woody Shaw - trumpet
Fred Henke - piano 
Neil Swainson - bass
Alexander Deutsch - drums

References 

Woody Shaw live albums
1989 live albums